Murad Gadzhiev (born 31 July 1961, Makhachkala, Dagestan Autonomous Soviet Socialist Republic) is a Russian political figure and a deputy of the 6th, 7th and 8th State Dumas. 

In 2000 he was granted a Candidate of Agricultural Sciences degree. In 1993 Gadzhiev became the director of the Derbent cognac factory. Later he became a deputy of the People's Assembly of the Republic of Dagestan. In 2011 he was elected deputy of the 6th State Duma from the Dagestan constituency. Gadzhiev ran with the United Russia. In 2016 and 2021 he was re-elected for the 7th and 8th State Dumas respectively.

Awards 
 Order of Friendship
 Order of Honour

References

1961 births
Living people
People from Makhachkala
United Russia politicians
21st-century Russian politicians
Sixth convocation members of the State Duma (Russian Federation)
Seventh convocation members of the State Duma (Russian Federation)
Eighth convocation members of the State Duma (Russian Federation)